The Capture of Pensacola took place in May 1719 during the War of the Quadruple Alliance when a French force led by Jean-Baptiste Le Moyne de Bienville took and occupied the settlement of Pensacola in the Spanish colony of Florida. The French occupied Pensacola until August 1719, when a large Spanish force arrived and compelled the small French garrison to surrender. This Spanish occupation only lasted until September 1, when a French fleet arrived to reassert French control.

The war ended status quo ante bellum and Pensacola was officially returned to Spanish control, though the French garrison did not withdraw until 1726.

References

Bibliography 
 Bense, Judith A. Archaeology of colonial Pensacola. University Press of Florida, 1999.
 Claiborne, John. Mississippi, as a province, territory, and state. Contains a somewhat detailed account of the affair.
 Marley, David. Wars of the Americas: a chronology of armed conflict in the New World, 1492 to the Present. ABC-Clio, 1998.

Conflicts in 1719
Battles in Florida
Battles involving France
Battles involving Spain
Battles of the War of the Quadruple Alliance
Battles and conflicts without fatalities
Capture
1719 in North America